Carolyn McCaskill is a deaf, African American, counselor and professor. She has been teaching at Gallaudet University since 1996, and currently holds the position of associate professor in the ASL and Deaf Studies Department.

Education 
PhD, Gallaudet University, Special Education Administration & Supervision (2005)
M.A., Counseling of the Deaf (1979)
B.A., Psychology-Social Work (1977)

Prior to college, McCaskill attended and graduated of the Alabama School for the Deaf in Talladega, Alabama.

Career 
McCaskill served as a counselor at the Model Secondary School for the Deaf, at the Houston Community College System, and as a career counselor at the Gallaudet University. She was the Coordinator of Minority Achievement and Multicultural Program for Pre-college Programs at Gallaudet University.

Seminars, workshops, and publications 
See http://www.nbda.org/spotlight/dr.-carolyn-mccaskill for a list of seminars
co-author of "The Hidden Treasure of Black ASL" (2011)

Awards 
Deaf Humanitarian Award from the National Action Network (NAN)
2013 Grio Award
Diversity Fellows in the Provost office in 2006
Thomas and Julia Mayes Award 2005

References

Further reading

Living people
Year of birth missing (living people)
Gallaudet University alumni
Educators of the deaf
American deaf people
Place of birth missing (living people)
Gallaudet University faculty
Educators from Alabama
African-American educators
American women academics
21st-century African-American people
21st-century African-American women